Het Feest van Tante Rita (Dutch for: Aunt Rita's Party) is a 2022 Dutch children's film directed by Dennis Bots. The film won the Golden Film award after having sold 100,000 tickets.

Principal photography began in May 2022. Lucretia van der Vloot, Esther Mbire and Sil van der Zwan play roles in the film. Tooske Ragas, Jack van Gelder and Edsilia Rombley also play roles in the film. It is Rombley's first major film role.

References

External links 
 

2022 films
2020s Dutch-language films
Dutch children's films
2020s children's films
Films directed by Dennis Bots
Films shot in the Netherlands